Towton Hall is a mansion, a home, near the village of Towton in North Yorkshire, England. The building, known to been   built as a residence in the seventeenth century and renovated and expanded since, is also  believed to include the remnants of Richard III’s commemorative chantry chapel, which was built after the Battle of Towton.  The commemorative chantry chapel at the Towton Battlefield was built to remember the victory of the House of York in the battle of Towton  in the years after the 1461 battle.  Many male skeletons of the soldiers were discovered beneath the floor of the dining room of Towton Hall.

References

External links 

 Library
 
 Remains of battle victims found at hall
 War of the Roses in Yorkshire - Yorkshire Battlefields | Welcome to Yorkshire

Selby District
Buildings and structures in North Yorkshire